Costa Azul LNG is a sea port and natural gas processing center, located 15 miles north of Ensenada, Baja California, Mexico. Opened in 2008, the terminal can process up to one billion cubic feet of natural gas per day. This is the first liquefied natural gas (LNG) terminal on the North America west coast. LNG carrier ships capable of holding up to 220,000m3 of LNG can dock in the deep water port off the coast to unload LNG. The natural gas from the terminal is used to produce electricity and is fed by pipe lines to factories. The longest pipeline runs north, to the United States. Sempra Energy is a partner in the port with PEMEX. The LNG ship Al Safliya was the first ship to port and unload at Costa Azul. The Al Safliya is a 210,000 cubic meter LNG ship, its LNG was from Qatar. The other Mexican LNG Terminal in the Pacific Ocean is at Manzanillo, Colima, the Manzanillo LNG Terminal.

Details
Contract to build the port was made in 2004. The port as a man made breakwater jetty. The port has two full-containment storage tanks each holding 160,000 cubic meters. The port was built by: Techint SA de CV of Mexico, Black & Veatch of Overland Park, KS, Mitsubishi Heavy Industries of Tokyo, Vinci Construction Grands Projects of France and Freyssinet: LNG Tank post-tensioning. A man made 625 meter breakwater was built to project ships docked off shore. To minimize the ecological impact, some sea life was relocated and a plant nursery was built on site. The port has one berth that can handle up to a Q-Max ship.

Usage
Shipments of LNG from the Middle East and Indonesia have gone to Asia as demand and prices are higher there. Also import demand is lower now, as the Kern River Pipeline and Ruby Pipeline are now feeding the Western and Southwestern United States.

See also

 Gas carriers
 Q-Flex
 List of gas carriers
 List of tankers
 Prelude FLNG
 CNG
 Mozah

References

Liquefied natural gas terminals
LNG tankers
Buildings and structures in Baja California
Transport in Ensenada Municipality
Petroleum transport
Sempra Energy